Outskirts of Town is the tenth studio album released by the American country music band Sawyer Brown, released in 1993 on Curb Records. The third and final album of their career to receive RIAA gold certification, it produced four hit singles on the Billboard country charts: "Thank God for You" (the band's third and final #1), "The Boys and Me" (#4), the title track (#40), and "Hard to Say" (#5). A dance mix of "The Boys and Me" is also included as a bonus track.

Track listing

Personnel 
Sawyer Brown
 Mark Miller – lead vocals 
 Gregg "Hobie" Hubbard – keyboards, backing vocals 
 Duncan Cameron – electric guitars, acoustic guitar, dobro, mandolin, backing vocals
 Jim Scholten – bass guitar 
 Joe "Curley" Smyth – drums, percussion

Additional musicians
 James Hooker – keyboards
 Mike Lawler – synthesizers
 Matt Rollings – acoustic piano
 Mac McAnally – acoustic guitar
 Sam Bush – mandolin
 JayDee Maness – steel guitar
 Roy Huskey Jr. – upright bass
 Eddie Bayers – drums
 Roger Hawkins – drums, percussion
 Terry McMillan – harmonica
 Dana McVicker – lead vocals (8)

Production 
 Mark Miller – producer 
 Mac McAnally – producer 
 Brian Tankersley – producer (12)
 Alan Schulman – recording, mixing 
 Kent Bruce – recording assistant, mix assistant 
 Steve Lowery – recording assistant, mix assistant 
 Wayne Mehl – recording assistant, mix assistant 
 Martin Woodlee – recording assistant, mix assistant 
 Denny Purcell – mastering (1-11)
 Hank Williams – mastering (12)
 Virginia Team – art direction 
 Jerry Joyner – design 
 Monica Mercer – front cover concept, scene photography 
 Beth Horsley – band photography
 Noel German – hair stylist 
 Lisa Miller – make-up

Studios
 Recorded at Muscle Shoals Sound Studios (Sheffield, Alabama); Scruggs Sound Studio, Treasure Isle Studios and The Dugout (Nashville, Tennessee).
 Tracks 1-11 mixed at Scruggs Sound Studio
 Track 12 remixed at Javelina Sound Studios (Nashville, Tennessee).
 Tracks 1-11 mastered at Georgetown Masters (Nashville, Tennessee).
 Track 12 mastered at MasterMix (Nashville, Tennessee).

Chart performance

Weekly charts

Year-end charts

External links
[ Outskirts of Town] at Allmusic

References

1993 albums
Curb Records albums
Sawyer Brown albums
Albums produced by Mac McAnally